Leeds Rhinos Women are a rugby league team based in Leeds, West Yorkshire, England.  The team is part of the Leeds Rhinos club and plays in the Women's Super League.

They are the current (2022) RFL Women's Super League champions and from 2023 they will become the first semi-professional women's rugby league team in the UK.

History

The team was formed in September 2017 with the aid of the Leeds Rhinos Foundation.  In December 2017 Rhino's forward, Adam Cuthbertson was appointed coach and Lois Forsell was named as captain in March 2018.

In the team's first season, they won the Women's Challenge Cup beating Castleford Tigers 20–14 in the final, at the Halliwell Jones Stadium, on 4 August 2018.

They successfully retained their title, after beating Castleford Tigers 16–10 in the final, at the University of Bolton Stadium, on 28 July 2019; in a repeat of the 2018 final.  In October they beat Castleford again 20–12 to win the Grand Final.

Lois Forsell missed the 2019 season and was succeeded as captain by Courtney Winfield-Hill. Forsell succeeded Cuthbertson as coach in February 2020.

2022 Squad

Seasons

Honours

League
Super League
Winners (2): 2019, 2022,
Runners-up (1): 2018,
League Leaders' Shield
Winners (1): 2018,
Runners-up (1): 2021,

Cups
Challenge Cup
Winners (2): 2018, 2019

References

Leeds Rhinos
2017 establishments in England
Rugby clubs established in 2017
Sport in Leeds
Women's rugby league teams in England
RFL Women's Super League